Boslen is the stage name of Corben Nikk Bowen, a Canadian rapper based in Vancouver, British Columbia. He is most noted for his EP Gonzo, which was shortlisted for the Juno Award for Rap Album/EP of the Year at the Juno Awards of 2023.

The son of a Jamaican father and an indigenous Canadian mother, he was raised in Chilliwack. He debuted in 2020 with the singles "Vultures" and "My Ways", before releasing his full-length debut album Dusk to Dawn in 2021. The album included a collaboration with Rascalz on the track "Note to the City". The Gonzo EP followed in 2022.

In 2023, he participated in an all-star recording of Serena Ryder's single "What I Wouldn't Do", which was released as a charity single to benefit Kids Help Phone's Feel Out Loud campaign for youth mental health.

References

21st-century Canadian rappers
Musicians from British Columbia
People from Chilliwack
Black Canadian musicians
First Nations musicians
Afro-Indigenous people
Living people
Year of birth missing (living people)